Dino da Costa (1 August 1931 – 10 November 2020) was a Brazilian-Italian professional footballer, who played as a central midfielder or striker.

Club career
Da Costa was born in Rio de Janeiro, Brazil. A prolific and effective centre-forward, he began his football career in his native country with Botafogo (1948–55), for whom he scored 36 goals from 51 appearances in the Campeonato Carioca, winning the top-goalscorer award in 1954, with 24 goals, and the league title in 1948, forming a notable attacking partnership with Vinício. He later moved to Italy, where he played for a number of clubs in Serie A. He made his Serie A debut on 18 September 1955, against Vicenza, with Roma, for whom he scored 71 times in 149 appearances between 1955 and 1961, also winning the Inter-Cities Fairs Cup with the club in 1961, and winning the Capocannoniere Award during the 1956–57 season as the Serie A top goalscorer, with 22 goals. Alongside Roma legend Francesco Totti, he is the joint all-time top scorer in the Rome Derby in official competitions, with 11 goals, and 12 including friendly matches.

During his time with Roma, Da Costa also played for Fiorentina on loan during part of the 1960–61 season, during which he won the Coppa Italia, the European Cup Winners' Cup, and the Coppa delle Alpi. After returning to Roma briefly during the following season, he moved to Atalanta (1961–63), where he won his second Coppa Italia in 1963, later moving to Juventus (1963–66), under Heriberto Herrera, where he won his third Coppa Italia title in 1965. He also played for Verona in Serie B (1966–67), and Ascoli in Serie C (1967–68), at the end of his career.

International career
Despite being born in Brazil, Da Costa played once at senior international level for Italy, scoring his only goal in a 2–1 defeat to Northern Ireland, on 15 January 1958; the defeat meant that Italy had failed to qualify for the 1958 FIFA World Cup, finishing second in their group, behind Northern Ireland, by a single point.

Managerial career
Following his professional footballing career, Da Costa also served briefly as a coach in the lower divisions, and the Vatican's Campionato della Città del Vaticano.

Death
Da Costa died in Verona on 10 November 2020, aged 89.

Honours

Club
Botafogo
Campeonato Carioca: 1948

Atalanta
Coppa Italia: 1962–63

Fiorentina
Coppa Italia: 1960–61
European Cup Winners' Cup: 1960–61
Coppa delle Alpi: 1960–61

Juventus
Coppa Italia: 1964–65

Roma
Inter-Cities Fairs Cup: 1960–61

Individual
Campeonato Carioca Top Goalscorer: 1954 (24 goals)
Serie A Top Goalscorer: 1956–57 (22 goals)

References
General
 
Specific

External links

1931 births
2020 deaths
Italian footballers
Italy international footballers
Italian people of Brazilian descent
Botafogo de Futebol e Regatas players
A.S. Roma players
ACF Fiorentina players
Atalanta B.C. players
Juventus F.C. players
Hellas Verona F.C. players
Ascoli Calcio 1898 F.C. players
Serie A players
Serie B players
Serie C players
Association football forwards
Footballers from Rio de Janeiro (city)
Brazilian footballers